These are term limited and retiring members of the House of Representatives of the Philippines during the 16th Congress of the Philippines. Term limited members are prohibited from running in the 2016 elections; they may run for any other positions, or may wait until the 2016 elections.

From congressional districts

Centrist Democratic Party
Rufus Rodriguez (Cagayan de Oro–2nd)
Running for mayor and lost

Lakas–Christian Muslim Democrats
Dato Arroyo (Camarines Sur–2nd)
Thelma Almario (Davao Oriental–2nd)
Running for Governor and lost to incumbent Representative Nelson Dayanghirang
Magtanggol Gunigundo (Valenzuela–2nd)
Running for Mayor and lost to incumbent Rexlon Gatchalian
Victor Francisco Ortega (La Union–1st)
Running for Mayor of San Fernando City and lost
Lani Revilla (Cavite-2nd)
Running for Mayor of Bacoor City and won
Martin Romualdez (Leyte–1st)
Running for Senator and lost
Philip Pichay (Surigao del Sur–1st)

Liberal Party
Ma. Jocelyn Bernos (Abra)
Running for Governor under National Unity Party and won
Herminia Roman (Bataan–1st)
Sonny Collantes (Batangas-3rd)
Jose Zubiri III (Bukidnon–3rd)
Enrico Echiverri (Caloocan-1st)
Running for Mayor under Nationalist People's Coalition and lost to incumbent Oscar Malapitan
Leni Robredo (Camarines Sur-3rd)
Running for Vice President and won
Gabriel Luis Quisumbing (Cebu-6th)
Running for City Mayor of Mandaue and won
Rommel Amatong (Compostela Valley)
Running for Governor and lost to Jayvee Tyron Uy
Isidro Ungab (Davao City–3rd)
Franklin Bautista (Davao del Sur–2nd)
Running for Vice Governor of Davao Occidental and won
Joaquin Carlos Rahman Nava (Guimaras)
Running for Governor and lost to incumbent Samuel Gumarin
Vicente Belmonte, Jr. (Iligan)
Running for City Mayor
Niel Tupas, Jr. (Iloilo–5th)
Running for Vice Governor and lost.
Manuel Agyao (Kalinga)
Danilo Fernandez (Laguna–1st)
Running for City Mayor of Santa Rosa and won
Imelda Dimaporo (Lanao del Norte-1st)
Running for Governor
Pangalian Balindong (Lanao del Sur–1st)
Andres Salvacion (Leyte–3rd)
Neptali Gonzales II (Mandaluyong)
Benjamin Asilo (Manila–1st)
Running for Vice Mayor of Manila and lost to Honey Lacuna
Marcelino Teodoro (Marikina–1st)
Running for Mayor of Marikina (under NPC) and won
Rodolfo Biazon (Muntinlupa)
Joseph Gilbert Violago (Nueva Ecija–2nd)
Czarina Umali (Nueva Ecija–3rd)
Running for Governor and won 
Roman Romulo (Pasig)
Running for Senator and lost
Arthur Robes (San Jose del Monte)
Running for Mayor and won
Damian Mercado (Southern Leyte)
Running for Governor and won
Francisco Matugas (Surigao del Norte–1st)
Guillermo Romarate, Jr. (Surigao del Norte–2nd)
Florencio Garay (Surigao del Sur–2nd)
Rosendo Labadlabad (Zamboanga del Norte–2nd)

Nacionalista Party
Al Francis Bichara (Albay–2nd)
Running for Governor and won
Nelson Dayanghirang (Davao Oriental–1st)
Running for Governor and won
Carlos M. Padilla (Nueva Vizcaya)
Running for Governor and won
Lino Cayetano (Taguig City)
Not Running. Returning to Directorial career.
Eleandro Jesus Madrona (Romblon)

National Unity Party
Elpidio Barzaga, Jr. (Dasmariñas)
Running for Mayor and won
Antonio Lagdameo, Jr. (Davao del Norte–2nd)
Trisha Bonoan-David (Manila–4th)
Running for Vice Mayor of Manila and lost to Honey Lacuna
Jeffrey Ferrer (UNeGa; Negros Occidental–4th)
Running for Vice Governor and lost
Emil Ong (Northern Samar–2nd)
Aleta Suarez (Quezon-3rd)
Arnulfo Go (Sultan Kudarat–2nd)
Victor Yu (Zamboanga del Sur–1st)

Nationalist People's Coalition
Evelio Leonardia (Bacolod City)
Running for City Mayor and won
Mark Llandro Mendoza (Batangas–4th)
Running for Governor and lost to Hermilando Mandanas
Salvacion Ponce Enrile (Cagayan-1st)
Not Running
Giorgidi Aggabao (Isabela–4th)
Josephine Lacson-Noel (Malabon)
Running for Mayor of Malabon and lost
Naida Angping (Manila–3rd)
Running for Vice Mayor of Manila and lost
George Arnaiz (Negros Oriental–1st)
Pryde Henry Teves (Negros Oriental–2nd)
Wilfredo Mark Enverga (Quezon-1st)
Sherwin Gatchalian (Valenzuela–1st)
Running for Senator and won
Manuel Luis Tantoco Lopez (Manila 1st District)

United Nationalist Alliance
Monique Lagdameo (Makati-1st)
Running for City Vice Mayor and won
Abby Binay (Makati–2nd)
Running for City Mayor and won
Amado Bagatsing (KABAKA; Manila–5th)
Running for Manila Mayor and lost to incumbent Joseph Estrada
Manny Pacquiao (PCM; Sarangani)
Running for Senator and won

From the party-list system

1st Consumer Alliance for Rural Energy
Michael Angelo Rivera
Running for Mayor of Padre Garcia, Batangas

Abono
Francisco Emmanuel Ortega III
Running for Governor of La Union and won

A TEACHER
Mariano Piamonte, Jr.

Agricultural Sector Alliance of the Philippines
Nicanor Briones
Running for Governor of Batangas ( under PMB/PDP–Laban) and lost to Hermilando Mandanas.

Anti-Crime and Terrorism-Community Involvement and Support
Samuel Pagdilao
Running for Senator and lost

Arts, Business and Science Professionals
Catalina Leonen-Pizarro

Bayan Muna
Neri Colmenares
Running for Senator and lost

Buhay Hayaang Yumabong
Irwin Tie ng
Running for Councilor of Manila, 5th District and won

Butil Farmers Party
Agapito Guanlao

Citizens' Battle Against Corruption
Cinchona Cruz-Gonzales

Cooperative NATCCO Network Party
Cresente Paez
Running for Senator and lost

Gabriela Women's Party
Luzviminda Ilagan

Kabataan Partylist
Terry Ridon

OFW Family Club
Johnny Revilla
Roy Señeres
Running for President and later withdrew. Died on February 9, 2016.

Trade Union Congress Party
Raymond Democrito Mendoza

Vacancies
Mel Senen Sarmiento (Samar-1st)
Appointed Secretary of the Department of the Interior and Local Government

Deaths
Enrique Garcia Jr. (Bataan-1st)
Died on June 13, 2016
Elmer Panotes (Camarines Norte-2nd)
Died on September 16, 2015
Enrique Murphy Cojuangco (Tarlac-1st)
Died on May 12, 2015

2016 Philippine general election